General elections were held in Chile on Sunday, 11 December 2005 to elect the president and members of the National Congress . None of the four presidential candidates received an absolute majority, leading to a runoff election between the top two candidates — Michelle Bachelet from the Coalition of Parties for Democracy and Sebastián Piñera from National Renewal — on Sunday, 15 January 2006. Bachelet was victorious with 53.49% of the vote. She succeeded President Ricardo Lagos on 11 March 2006, for a period of four years, after Congress reformed the Constitution in September 2005 and reduced the term from six years.

Electoral system
The president was elected using the two-round system. All of the 120 seats in the Chamber of Deputies were contested, while 20 out of 38 seats in the Senate were up for election (even-numbered regions and the metropolitan region). Deputies serve for a period of four years, while senators serve for a period of eight years. Reelection is permitted.

Presidential candidates

Michelle Bachelet (Socialist Party of Chile)
Bachelet, who led in every major poll, served as Health Minister before President Lagos named her as Chile's first female Defense Minister in 2002. She was supported by the Coalition of Parties for Democracy, which has governed Chile since 1990. The coalition groups four parties: the Christian Democratic Party (PDC), the Party for Democracy (PPD), the Socialist Party (PS), and the Social Democrat Radical Party (PRSD).

Up until May 2005 two candidates vied for the coalition's nomination: Soledad Alvear (PDC) and Michelle Bachelet (PS). A primary was scheduled to be held on 31 July 2005, to choose the nominee. Political polls in Chile indicated that either candidate would trounce the right-wing Alliance nominee Joaquín Lavín in a two-person race. The political atmosphere changed, however, when another Alianza candidate came to the scene: businessman Sebastián Piñera from the center-right National Renewal. This led, among other reasons, to the withdrawal of Soledad Alvear from the Concertación nomination on 24 May 2005.

Tomás Hirsch (Humanist Party)
Hirsch, a Humanist, ran as his party's nominee for president for 1999 obtaining 0.5%. On this election he ran with the support of the political pact Juntos Podemos Más (Together We Can Do More), which is made up mainly of the legally constituted Communist and Humanist parties plus other political groups and social organizations. In previous elections the candidates presented independently by the pact's parties were consistently in third place, behind the two major coalitions, and holding poll numbers in the single-digit level.

To elect a single candidate a national public survey was held on 28 May 2005. On 5 June 2005, an assembly elected Humanist Tomás Hirsch as their final candidate. Other pre-candidates included: Julián Alcayaga (Committee for the Defense of Copper) and Nicolás García (Block for Socialism). Two candidates withdrew before the survey and gave their support to Hirsch: Tomás Moulian (Communist) and Manuel Jacques (Christian Left). One candidate withdrew before the assembly: Jorge Pavez (Social Force).

Joaquín Lavín (Independent Democratic Union)
Lavín ran as the Alliance's nominee for president in 1999, losing in a tight 2000 runoff to Lagos. Considered for a long time prior to the 2005 election as the Alliance's unique candidate, as the contest drew nearer, however, his public persona began to lose credibility, perhaps due to a mediocre mayorship of the Santiago municipality the previous years, and his candidacy began to lose steam, to the point that it was called into question. RN, the Alliance's other party, decided to compete with Lavín with a candidate of their own (Piñera), breaking up the Alliance's unity in the election.

Sebastián Piñera (National Renewal)

Piñera was proclaimed a candidate by the National Renewal party on 14 May 2005. His nomination caused discomfort within the Independent Democratic Union (UDI—its fellow coalition party member), as both parties were supposed to support Lavín as the single coalition candidate. A primary proposed by UDI to elect a single candidate representing the Alliance was rejected by RN. Piñera's nomination was welcomed by the public and won quick support in opinion polls.

Rejected candidacy
The independent Mapuche candidate Aucán Huilcamán registered his nomination on 12 September, but it was rejected three days later by the Electoral Commission (Servicio Electoral) due to his failure to obtain the minimum number of signatures required by law for an independent candidacy. Huilcamán appealed using the argument that in the past parliamentary election there was a law created specifically to help the candidates of the Christian Democracy Party re-register their candidacies. After the support given to Huilcamán by other candidates, the government sent a bill to Congress, with immediate discussion, to extend the time of registration; a bill that would have also helped 17 other candidacies that were rejected by the Electoral Service. Nonetheless the bill was rejected by a lack of quorum, denying Huilcamán a possible place in the ballot.

Parliamentary election
The Chamber of Deputies prior to this election was composed of 62 CPD deputies (23 Christian Democrats, 20 PPD, ten Socialists, six PRSD and three independents), 57 APC deputies (31 UDI, 18 RN and eight independents) and one independent (off-pact).

The Senate prior to this election was composed of 38 directly elected senators and nine non-elected senators (institutional senators, or senators for life). Among the elected, 20 seats are held by the CPD (eleven Christian Democrats, five Socialists, three PPD and one PRSD) and 18 by the APC (six independents, six UDI and six RN). A constitutional reform in 2005 eliminated non-elected senators starting on 11 March 2006, the day the newly elected senators were sworn in.

Of the Senate seats being contested, eleven were held by the CPD (ten Christian Democrats and one Socialist) and nine by the APC (four independents, three UDI and two RN).

Campaign

Debates
There were two scheduled debates between the presidential candidates during the first round, both including all four candidates. A third televised debate was dismissed by the respective campaign teams. However, during the second debate, Tomás Hirsch said he was open to a third debate.

The first debate, titled Foro Presidencial: Chile 2005, organized by the Latin American station CNN en Español and the local Canal 13, took place on 19 October, at 10 p.m., at Espacio Riesco in Santiago. It ran for one hour, giving each candidate ten minutes to answer seven questions, giving priority to national issues. There was no studio audience. It was hosted by Glenda Umaña (CNN en Español) and Constanza Santa María (Canal 13).

The second debate took place on 16 November at 10 p.m., at the CasaPiedra venue in Santiago. It was organized by Anatel (National Television Association), and was broadcast by Canal 13, TVN, Megavisión and Chilevisión, with TVN in charge of production. Running for one hour and 40 minutes, a question was asked to each candidate by a panel of four journalists. The four candidates were seated behind desks on stage, instead of standing at podiums as they had done in the first debate.

Prior to the second round, Bachelet and Piñera held a televised debate on 4 January 2006, which was organized by Anatel and broadcast by the four main over-the-air television channels. A Time Research poll showed that Bachelet was the winner of the debate with 49%, against 41% for Piñera. On the other hand, another poll, by El Mercurio-Opina, showed that Piñera won the debate with 43.3% of the preferences against 42.9% for Bachelet.

Piñera offered Bachelet to hold a second debate before the election, to discuss regional issues, but this was rejected by Bachelet's campaign team. Bachelet also turned down a radio debate with Piñera.

Opinion polls

Opinion polls released after Sebastián Piñera's entrance and Soledad Alvear's withdrawal showed Michelle Bachelet leading the right-wing candidates (Piñera and Joaquín Lavín) by a wide margin, but below the 50% plus 1 vote needed to win the election, a situation that would lead to a runoff in which, according to the same polls, she would comfortably defeat any of the two right-wing candidates. Some analysts commented that in some of these polls Bachelet would indeed have obtained an absolute majority in the first round, if blanks were discarded and undecided votes were evenly distributed among candidates. However, later opinion polls released nearer the election showed a decline of Bachelet in favor of Piñera and Tomás Hirsch, showing more clearly that the election would be decided in a runoff.

The first opinion poll released after the first round, published by El Mercurio-Opina on 18 December, had Bachelet with 42.8%, Piñera with 37.5% and 19.7% undecided. Later opinion polls showed similar results, except for one poll showing Piñera above Bachelet by 1%. The polls released showed on average that Bachelet maintained an advantage over Piñera above 5%, but with a large number of voters (18%) still undecided or that would not declare a preference. If this last percentage was removed from the vote, then Bachelet, the polls showed, would have won the presidency by a margin above 7%, which was accurate with the final results of the election.

Results

President

The first government announcement regarding election results came at 6:30 p.m. local time (21:30 GMT), and included information from around 12% of polling stations counted. Subsequent preliminary results were announced during the day by the Interior Ministry undersecretary and published on a special Internet site. These results indicated that the election was to be decided in a runoff on 15 January 2006, in which Michelle Bachelet would face Sebastián Piñera. Official and final results, validated by the Electoral Tribunal (Tricel), were published on the Diario Oficial (official gazette) on 27 December 2005, and made the runoff election official.

On election day, at 9:30 p.m. local time, before the third preliminary results were announced, Joaquín Lavín conceded a second-place defeat in the election and said he would support Sebastián Piñera in the runoff election. Later in the day, JPM candidate Tomás Hirsch said he would nullify his vote in the upcoming runoff; an opinion which was objected by the pact's Communist wing, which said they would support Bachelet if five proposals delivered to her were accepted and incorporated into the candidate's government program; these proposals dealt with changing the electoral system and granting workers more rights.

The runoff election between Michelle Bachelet and Sebastián Piñera took place on 15 January 2006.

Final results were announced on 30 January 2006, by the Electoral Tribunal. They indicated that Michelle Bachelet won the presidency with 53.49% of the votes classified as valid, 51.98% of the total votes cast, and 45.28% support of registered voters.

Sebastián Piñera conceded defeat immediately following a government announcement made on election day that included results from 97.52% of ballot boxes counted.

Senate

Chamber of Deputies

Elected members
Elected candidates appear in bold. (R) indicates candidates running for re-election. Strikethrough names indicate candidacies rejected by the Electoral Service (Servel).

Chamber of Deputies

Senate

Election timeline
 5 January 2005: Former president Eduardo Frei declines a possible presidential candidacy.
 14 January 2005: Soledad Alvear defeats senator Adolfo Zaldívar in an internal primary, and is proclaimed presidential pre-candidate by the PDC.
 24 April 2005: Michelle Bachelet is proclaimed presidential candidate by PRSD.
 27 April 2005: Alvear and Bachelet hold a televised primary debate in Hualpén.
 14 May 2005: Sebastián Piñera is proclaimed presidential candidate by National Renewal.
 24 May 2005: Alvear declines her presidential pre-candidacy.
 5 June 2005: Tomás Hirsch is proclaimed presidential candidate of pact Juntos Podemos Más.
 19 June 2005: Joaquín Lavín is proclaimed presidential candidate by the Independent Democratic Union.
 30 July 2005: Bachelet is proclaimed presidential candidate by PDC.
 21 August 2005: Bachelet is proclaimed presidential candidate by PS and PPD.
 7 September 2005: RN candidate Sebastián Piñera officially registers his candidacy for president.
 8 September 2005: CPD candidate Michelle Bachelet officially registers her candidacy for president, as does UDI candidate Joaquín Lavín.
 11 September 2005: Deadline for voters to register.
 12 September 2005: Deadline for candidates to register and official start of campaigning. During the day, independent candidate Aucán Huilcamán officially registers his candidacy for president, as does JPM candidate Tomás Hirsch.
 15 September 2005: The Electoral Service (Servel) rejects the candidacy of Mapuche leader Aucán Huilcamán.
 19 October 2005: The first televised debate among all candidates takes place.
 11 November 2005: The free televised campaign time begins with candidate receiving five minutes each; street ads are allowed.
 16 November 2005: The second televised debate among all candidates takes place.
 6 December 2005: Bachelet cancels her final campaign rally after five of her supporters are killed in a bus crash.
 9 December 2005: Official campaigning ends at midnight; electoral publicity is no longer allowed.
 11 December 2005: Election day. Voting begins at 7 AM local time (10:00 GMT).
 26 December 2005: The Electoral Tribunal (Tricel) publishes the final and official results of the first round election.
 27 December 2005: First round results are published on the Official Gazette.
 1 January 2006: Electoral campaigning for the runoff election begins. Each candidate receives two and a half minutes of free television airtime.
 4 January 2006: The only televised debate between the two runoff candidates takes place.
 12 January 2006: Official campaigning ends.
 15 January 2006: Runoff election takes place. Socialist candidate Michelle Bachelet is elected president.
 30 January 2006: The Tricel publishes the final and official results of the runoff election.
 30 January 2006: President-elect Michelle Bachelet announces the members of her cabinet.
 11 March 2006: President-elect Bachelet is sworn in by the National Congress in Valparaíso.

See also

Politics of Chile
List of political parties in Chile

References

External links
 Official results from the Election Qualifier Tribunal
 Preliminary results from the Ministry of Interior
 Electoral Service (Servel)
 Bachelet for President official website
 Hirsch for President official website
 Lavín for President official website
 Piñera for President official website
 Electoral Stock Market (University of Chile/University of Chicago)
Angus Reid Consultants - Election Tracker
Intelligence brief: Chile by Dr. Michael A. Weinstein, Asian Tribune, 21 December 2005

Presidential elections in Chile
Elections in Chile
Chile
General
General
December 2005 events in South America
January 2006 events in South America